Salute to Excellence is a category of awards issued by the Helicopter Association International since 1960, "for outstanding achievements in the international helicopter community".

Individual awards
Aviation Maintenance Technician Award (since 1994)
Aviation Repair Specialist Award (since 1995)
Igor I. Sikorsky Award for Humanitarian Service (since 1989; incorporates the former Crew of the Year Award)
1990 Mykola Melnyk for his service as a Chernobyl liquidator
2015 Portuguese Air Force 751 Squadron - S&R
Crew of the Year (1980–1995)
The Joe Mashman Safety Award (since 1987)
2015 Edwin McConkey - Approach Software 
Outstanding Certified Flight Instructor Award (since 1985)
2015 Simon Spencer-Bower Wanaka Helicopters
Agusta Westland Community Service Award (since 1990)
Raise Your Sites! Award (1983–1988)
Max Schumacher Memorial Award (1967–1988)
Fly Neighborly Award (1982–1988)
Airbus Golden Hour Award (since 1982)
2015 Snohomish Co
Excellence in Communications Award (since 1975)
2015 Micheal Hirschburg - Vertiflite 
Helicopter Maintenance Award (since 1973)
2015 Patrick Cox - Robinson Helicopter Company
MD Helicopters Law Enforcement Award (since 1972)
2015 U.S. Park Police Eagle One
Lawrence D. Bell Memorial Award (since 1971)
Robert E. Trimble Memorial Award  (since 1961)
Appareo Systems Pilot of the Year Award  (since 1960)
2015 Gary Dahlen - King Fire
Bell Helicopter Lifetime Achievement
2015 Lou Bartolotta

See also

 List of aviation awards

References

External links
Salute to Excellence Awards Program on the HAI official web site
Past Award Winners List of award winners since 2002
“Salute to Excellence” Awards Full all-time list of award winners by the HAI's Helicopter Annual magazine

Aviation awards